"Girl Like You" is a song written by Jaron Boyer, Josh Mirenda, and Michael Tyler and recorded by American country music singer Jason Aldean. It was released in September 2018 as the third single from Aldean's 2018 album Rearview Town.

Content
Billy Dukes of Taste of Country described the song as a "mid-tempo love song" and a "beat-driven slice of sultry country and hip-hop love." He also compared its hip-hop and R&B influences to "Burnin' It Down". One Country writer Annie Reuter also found R&B influences in Aldean's performance, saying that it was a "blend of rock and R&B influences" and that it had "soaring guitar parts, seductive beats and his slowed singing style", and that it had a theme about "a long night ahead with his love". Aldean told Nash Country Daily that "I've always loved big guitars and a good groove, but we've never really done it like this before. So, it's cool that we can do that coming off something like ['You Make It Easy' and 'Drowns the Whiskey']."

Commercial performance
The song has sold 105,000 copies in the United States as of March 2019.

Charts

Weekly charts

Year-end charts

Certifications

References

2018 singles
2018 songs
Jason Aldean songs
BBR Music Group singles
Song recordings produced by Michael Knox (record producer)
Songs written by Jaron Boyer